America³ (USA–23) was an  American International America's Cup Class yacht that successfully defended the 1992 America's Cup challenge from the Il Moro Challenge racing syndicate.

America³ was one of four yachts built for the America3 Foundation racing syndicate, headed by American businessman Bill Koch, for the 1992 Citizen Cup. It was launched in 1992.

America³ won the Citizen Cup, then successfully defended the America's Cup against the challenge of the Italian yacht Il Moro di Venezia V (ITA-25), winner of the 1992 Louis Vuitton Cup.

The America3 Foundation racing syndicate entered the 1995 Citizen Cup with an all women's programme.  The team sailed America³ (USA–23) in the first three stages of the Round Robin, then switched to their newly delivered yacht Mighty Mary (USA–43) for the remainder of the event.

America³ is on display at Herreshoff Marine Museum Bristol, Rhode Island.

References

International America's Cup Class yachts
1990s sailing yachts
Sailing yachts designed by Doug Peterson
Sailing yachts built in the United States
San Diego Yacht Club yachts
1992 America's Cup